Gaston Peltier (1876 – unknown death) was a French footballer. He competed in the 1900 Olympic Games. In Paris, Peltier won a silver medal as a member of the Club Français team.

References

External links

1876 births
French footballers
Olympic silver medalists for France
Olympic footballers of France
Footballers at the 1900 Summer Olympics
Year of death missing
Olympic medalists in football
Medalists at the 1900 Summer Olympics
Association football forwards
Date of birth missing
Place of birth missing
Place of death missing